Pseudocrossocheilus longibullus is a species of cyprinid fish endemic to China.

References

Fish described in 2003
Pseudocrossocheilus